Bain Capital Ventures LLC is the venture capital division within Bain Capital, which has approximately $160 billion of assets under management worldwide. The firm's early-stage investments have included Attentive, Bloomreach, Clari, Docusign, Flywire, LinkedIn, Moveworks, Rapid7, and Redis. Bain Capital Ventures manages  $10 billion of committed capital, has over 400 active portfolio companies, and has offices in Boston, New York City, Palo Alto, and San Francisco.

Investments
Bain Capital Ventures has raised slightly over $10 billion of investor capital since 2001 across nine core investment funds and three co-investment funds. The firm is currently investing its ninth fund, Bain Capital Venture Fund 2021, which raised $950 million from investors. The following is a summary of Bain Capital Venture's private equity funds raised from its inception through the end of 2021:

Some of the company's notable investments have included: Attentive, Bloomreach, Clari, Docusign, Flywire, LinkedIn, Moveworks, Rapid7, and Redis.

Notable people
 Ajay Agarwal
 Scott Friend
 Matt Harris
 Aaref Hilaly
 Sarah Hinkfuss
 Merritt Hummer
 Christina Melas-Kyriazi
 Enrique Salem
 Kevin Zhang

References

External links
 
 Latest news from Bain Capital Ventures and portfolio companies (pressroom)

Bain Capital
Financial services companies established in 1984
Venture capital firms of the United States
Companies based in Boston
American companies established in 2001